Trincity is a planned community in northern Trinidad.  It is located along the East–West Corridor south of Tunapuna and north of Piarco.

Trincity was developed by Home Construction Limited. In recent years Trincity has been one of the major growth areas in Trinidad and Tobago (together with Chaguanas). Trincity Mall has been substantially enlarged, to a total of 2 million square feet making it the largest contiguous mall in the Caribbean. Trincity Mall's anchor tenants include Caribbean Cinemas (eight-screen cineplex), Radio Shack, Francis Fashions, Tru Valu Grand Market, Pennywise Superstore and Excellent Stores. Construction of an office park, three gated communities and a PGA golf course have been completed.

Gallery 

Gated communities
Neighbourhoods in Trinidad and Tobago